The Accomplice (French: La complice) is a 1932 French crime film directed by Giuseppe Guarino and starring Régine Poncet, Jean Bradin and Gilbert Périgneaux.

Cast
 Régine Poncet 
 Jean Bradin 
 Gilbert Périgneaux 
 Paul Menant 
 Philippe Richard 
 Brunell 
 Guitarre

References

Bibliography 
 Crisp, Colin. Genre, Myth and Convention in the French Cinema, 1929-1939. Indiana University Press, 2002.

External links 
 

1932 films
1930s French-language films
Films directed by Giuseppe Guarino
French black-and-white films
1930s French films
1932 crime films
French crime films